The NOCO Company (commonly referred to as NOCO) is an American privately held multinational corporation that designs, manufactures, and markets consumer electronics, automotive chemicals, plastics and various electrical components.

Overview
NOCO was founded as Nook & O'Neill in 1914. Joseph Henry Nook Sr. was later inducted into the Automotive Hall of Fame for the contributions he made to the automotive industry with The NOCO Company. Their original catalog can still be found in various automotive museums and archives. NOCO holds over two dozen patents including a patent for Portable vehicle battery jump start apparatus with safety protection.

Acquisition
In 2009, NOCO acquired Advanced Fishing Technologies ("AFT)", a high-tech manufacturer of marine, industrial and photostatic battery management solutions.

ChargeLight
NOCO's ChargeLight was first created from a fully funded Kickstarter campaign, which raised $121,329.

Genius Boost family
The Genius Boost family of lithium jump starters is one of the company's most popular line of products. The GB30 car jump starter was rated 9/10 by TopSpeed and "Good" by Consumer Reports. Production is in Vietnam, Malaysia and China.

References

1914 establishments in Ohio
American companies established in 1914
Consumer battery manufacturers
Manufacturing companies based in Ohio
Technology companies of the United States
Cuyahoga County, Ohio